Edward Gernel Fletcher, known by his stage name Duke Bootee (June 6, 1951 – January 13, 2021) was an American early record producer and rapper.

His best known single, "The Message", was released in 1982 on Sugar Hill Records. The hit song featured rappers Duke Bootee and Melle Mel. The record label marketed the song under the name Grandmaster Flash and the Furious Five. Later, he collaborated again with Melle Mel on the singles "Message II (Survival)", and "New York New York", in which the latter was credited to Grandmaster Flash and the Furious Five.

After concluding his music career in the early 1990s, Duke Bootee acquired teaching certification and became an educator.

He died January 13, 2021, of end-stage congestive heart failure.

Discography
Bust Me Out (1984)

References

2021 deaths
Rappers from New York City
Record producers from New York (state)
1951 births
Place of birth missing
20th-century American rappers